The 2014 Toledo Rockets football team represented the University of Toledo in the 2014 NCAA Division I FBS football season. They were led by head coach Matt Campbell in his third full year after coaching the Rockets in the 2011 Military Bowl. They played their home games at the Glass Bowl and were members of the West Division of the Mid-American Conference. They finished the season 9–4, 7–1 in MAC play to finish in a tie for the West Division title with Northern Illinois. Due to their head-to-head loss to Northern Illinois, they did not represent the West Division in the MAC Championship Game. They were invited to the GoDaddy Bowl where they defeated Arkansas State.

Schedule

References

Toledo
Toledo Rockets football seasons
LendingTree Bowl champion seasons
Toledo Rockets football